Kalateh-ye Mahmud Ali (also Romanized as Kalāteh-ye Maḩmūd ‘Alī; also known as Maḩmūd ‘Alī and Mahmood Ali) is a village in Meyghan Rural District, in the Central District of Nehbandan County, South Khorasan Province, Iran. At the 2006 census, its population was 76, in 23 families.

References 

Populated places in Nehbandan County